Rafaela Díaz Valiente MML (9 April 1906 – 9 June  1996) better known as Rafaela Aparicio was a famous Spanish film and theatre actress.

She made more than 100 films. The most remembered are Carlos Saura's Anna and the Wolves, Mama Turns 100 and Fernando Fernán Gómez's El extraño viaje. She died of a stroke in Madrid in a retirement home.

Selected filmography

Honours 
 Gold Medal of Merit in Labour (Kingdom of Spain, 23 April 1976).

References

External links

1906 births
1996 deaths
Best Actress Goya Award winners
People from Marbella
Honorary Goya Award winners
20th-century Spanish actresses